Egin may refer to:

 Egin (newspaper), a defunct bilingual Basque-Spanish newspaper
 Eğin, the name for the town of Kemaliye, Turkey, until about 1923
 Egin, Idaho, United States, an unincorporated community
 Yuri Egin, an anime-only character of the manga Blue Exorcist

See also
 Egan (disambiguation)
 Egen (disambiguation)
 Egin (disambiguation)
 Eagan (disambiguation)